Lygniodes vampyrus is a moth of the family Erebidae. It is found in the South India, Sri Lanka and Thailand.

References

Moths described in 1794
Lygniodes
Moths of Asia